Morné Engelbrecht (born 13 August 1988) is a South African-born Namibian cricketer. He is a right-handed batsman and a right-arm medium-fast bowler. He has played for the Namibian Under-19s cricket team since January 2006, when he played in the Under-19s World Cup, generally as a substitute for Jason Bandlow.

Engelbrecht was part of the Namibian Under-19 team which won the Under-19 African Championship in 2007.

References

External links
Morne Engelbrecht at Cricket Archive

1988 births
South African emigrants to Namibia
Namibian cricketers
Living people
People from Empangeni